Mr. Wu is a 1919 British drama film directed by Maurice Elvey and starring Matheson Lang, Roy Royston, Lillah McCarthy and Meggie Albanesi. It was based on a 1913 play Mr. Wu by Maurice Vernon and Harold Owen. During the filming Albanesi became infatuated with Lang. The picture was made by Stoll Pictures, and was one of their first major successes.  Lon Chaney played the title role in a 1927 remake. The screenplay concerns a Chinese Mandarin who murders his daughter.

Plot summary
A Chinese Mandarin murders his daughter after she falls in love with an Englishman.

Cast
 Matheson Lang - Mr Wu
 Lillah McCarthy - Mrs Gregory
 Meggie Albanesi - Nang Ping
 Roy Royston - Basil Gregory
 Teddy Arundell - Mr Gregory

References

Bibliography
 Sweet, Matthew. Shepperton Babylon: The Lost Worlds of British Cinema. Faber and Faber, 2005.

External links

1919 films
British silent feature films
1919 drama films
1910s English-language films
Films directed by Maurice Elvey
British films based on plays
Stoll Pictures films
British drama films
British black-and-white films
1910s British films
Silent drama films